Zone axis, a term sometimes used to refer to "high-symmetry" orientations in a crystal, most generally refers to any direction referenced to the direct lattice (as distinct from the reciprocal lattice) of a crystal in three dimensions. It is therefore indexed with direct lattice indices, instead of with Miller indices.

High-symmetry zone axes through a crystal lattice, in particular, often lie in the direction of tunnels through the crystal between planes of atoms. This is because, as we see below, such zone axis directions generally lie within more than one plane of atoms in the crystal.

Zone-axis indexing 

The translational invariance of a crystal lattice is described by a set of unit cell, direct lattice basis vectors (contravariant or polar) called a, b, and c, or equivalently by the lattice parameters, i.e. the magnitudes of the vectors, called a, b and c, and the angles between them, called α (between b and c), β (between c and a), and γ (between a and b). Direct lattice vectors have components measured in distance units, like meters (m) or angstroms (Å).

A lattice vector is indexed by its coordinates in the direct lattice basis system  and is generally placed between square brackets []. Angle brackets 〈〉 are used to refer to a symmetrically equivalent class of lattice vectors (i.e. the set of vectors generated by an action of the lattice's symmetry group). In the case of a cubic lattice, for instance, 〈100〉 represents [100], [010], [001], [00], [00] and [00] because each of these vectors is symmetrically equivalent under a 90 degree rotation along an axis. A bar over a coordinate is equivalent to a negative sign (e.g.).

The term "zone axis" more specifically refers to the direction of a direct-space lattice vector. For example, since the [120] and [240] lattice vectors are parallel, their orientations both correspond the 〈120〉 zone of the crystal. Just as a set of lattice planes in direct space corresponds to a reciprocal lattice vector in the complementary space of spatial frequencies and momenta, a "zone" is defined as a set of reciprocal lattice planes in frequency space that corresponds to a lattice vector in direct space.

The reciprocal space analog to a zone axis is a "lattice plane normal" or "g-vector direction". Reciprocal lattice vectors (one-form or axial) are Miller-indexed using coordinates in the reciprocal lattice basis  instead, generally between round brackets (similar to square brackets [] for direct lattice vectors). Curly brackets {} (not to be confused with a mathematical set) are used to refer to a symmetrically equivalent class of reciprocal lattice vectors, similar to angle brackets 〈〉 for classes of direct lattice vectors.

Thus a reciprocal lattice vector  or  has a direction perpendicular to a crystallographic plane and a magnitude  equal to the reciprocal of the spacing  between those  planes, measured in spatial frequency units, e.g. of cycles per angstrom (cycles/Å).

This is true even if, as is often the case, the basis vector set used to describe the lattice is not Cartesian.

Zone-axis patterns 

By extension, a [uvw] zone-axis pattern (ZAP) is a diffraction pattern taken with an incident beam, e.g. of electrons, X-rays or neutrons traveling along a lattice direction specified by the zone-axis indices [uvw]. Because of their small wavelength λ, high energy electrons used in electron microscopes have a very large Ewald sphere radius (1/λ), so that electron diffraction generally "lights up" diffraction spots with g-vectors (hkl) that are perpendicular to [uvw].

One result of this, as illustrated in the figure above, is that "low-index" zones are generally perpendicular to "low-Miller index" lattice planes, which in turn have small spatial frequencies (g-values) and hence large lattice periodicities (d-spacings). A possible intuition behind this is that in electron microscopy, for electron beams to be directed down wide (i.e. easily visible) tunnels between columns of atoms in a crystal, directing the beam down a low-index (and by association high-symmetry) zone axis may help.

See also 

 Crystallography
 Dual basis
 Reciprocal lattice
 Miller index
 Diffraction
 Electron diffraction
 Transmission electron microscopy

Footnotes

External links 
 International Tables for Crystallography

Materials science
Crystals
Electron microscopy
Crystallography
Diffraction